Coventry West was a parliamentary constituency in the city of Coventry in the West Midlands of England.  It returned one Member of Parliament (MP) to the House of Commons of the Parliament of the United Kingdom, elected by the first past the post system.

History

The constituency was created for the 1945 general election, and abolished for the 1950 general election.

Boundaries 
The County Borough of Coventry wards of Bablake, Cheylesmore, Earlsdon, Greyfriars, Radford, and Westwood.

Members of Parliament

Election results

References 
 

Parliamentary constituencies in Coventry
Parliamentary constituencies in the West Midlands (county) (historic)
Constituencies of the Parliament of the United Kingdom established in 1945
Constituencies of the Parliament of the United Kingdom disestablished in 1950